Scopula lutearia is a moth of the  family Geometridae. It is found in central China.

References

Moths described in 1897
lutearia
Moths of Asia